Moyogalpa is a municipality in the Rivas department of Nicaragua. Moyogalpa is the largest village and the home of the largest of the three ferry ports on Ometepe Island. There are multiple hotels, hostels, and restaurants on the island, along with small shops called "Pulperias" selling a variety of items from snacks to basic clothing. In 2016, Walmart opened a Pali Supermarket in Moyogalpa to serve the 40,000+ island population, including many expats and the thousands of visiting tourists. Since opening Pali, many of the small pulperias have improved their own meat, produce and items for sale displays, adding many items not offered by Pali.

Etymology
In the indigenous language Moyogalpa means "place of mosquitos."

Traditions 
Moyogalpa like many of the towns along the island the people of Moyogalpa mix indigenous traditions, European, and Catholic traditions. There is no time when this is better displayed than during the patron saint's festival. Moyogalpa's festival is known for el baile de las Inditas.  This dance is supposed to represent the relationship between the indigenous people of Nicaragua and the Europeans and the combining of the two cultures. The woman represents the indigenous while the man represents the dance. The dance represents the relationship as one filled with love, respect, and chivalry, although not necessarily equality.

Visiting Here & Getting Around 
There are plenty of places to stay in Moyogalpa from high end hotels to renting a hammock on a balcony.  The locals are very friendly and welcoming to the 40,000 plus visitors they receive every year.  Most visitors either take the apollo bus (often mistranslated as "chicken bus" in English) or they rent a scooter or motorcycle to get around.

Ferry Port 
There are multiple ferries and lanchas that run throughout the day, every day, including holidays.  The majority run from San Jorge Ferry Port to Moyogalpa, however some run to San José del Sur.  Ferry hours are seasonal and somewhat weather dependent.

The majority of people do not bring their vehicle across to the island, they travel on the ferry's or lancha's on foot.  The majority of vehicle traffic is commercial in nature.  A reservation 5 days in advance is recommended if you are bringing a vehicle across in the busy season (mid-November - mid-May).

References 

Municipalities of the Rivas Department